Uğur Gürses is a Turkish financial columnist. He has been writing financial and economic articles for daily Radikal newspaper.

References

Turkish journalists
Business and financial journalists
Year of birth missing (living people)
Living people
Turkish columnists
Radikal (newspaper) people
Place of birth missing (living people)